"Til It's Gone" is a song written by Rodney Clawson, David Lee Murphy, and Jimmy Yeary and recorded by American country music artist Kenny Chesney. It was released in October 2014 as the second single from Chesney’s 2014 album The Big Revival.

Critical reception
The song received a favorable review from Taste of Country, which said that "the lines are sharp and catchy and roll off the Tennessee native’s tongue like a great pickup line" and it is "a song that could be found on so many of Chesney’s previous records, yet it still sounds fresh for today."

Music video
The music video was directed by Don Carr and was premiered in October 2014. It was taken from CMT Instant Jam, filmed live at the Georgia Theatre in Athens, Georgia.

Chart performance
"Til It's Gone" debuted at number 40 on the U.S. Billboard Country Airplay chart for the week of October 11, 2014. It also debuted at number 48 on the U.S. Billboard Hot Country Songs chart for the week of October 18, 2014.

Year-end charts

References

2014 songs
2014 singles
Kenny Chesney songs
Columbia Records singles
Songs written by Rodney Clawson
Songs written by David Lee Murphy
Songs written by Jimmy Yeary
Song recordings produced by Buddy Cannon